Karapiro is a settlement and rural area in the Waipa District and Waikato region of New Zealand's North Island. It includes both the artificially created Lake Karapiro and the accompanying Karapiro Power Station. Karapiro is located just off State Highway 1, south-west of Cambridge.

History
In about 1600, Te Ihingarangi built a pā (fortified village) called Te Tiki o Ihingarangi near where Lake Karapiro is today.

In 1830 Ngāti Hauā defeated Ngāti Maru in a battle at Taumatawīwī, two kilometres south of Karapiro Domain. The site was flooded when the dam was built and the lake created in 1947.

A man opened fire inside the Karapiro Cafe and Grits in April 2019. The suspect was later put under mental health care; the victim survived with serious injuries.

Demographics
The settlement is part of the larger Karapiro statistical area.

Karapiro Village had a population of 303 at the 2018 New Zealand census, an increase of 102 people (50.7%) since the 2013 census, and an increase of 96 people (46.4%) since the 2006 census. There were 102 households, comprising 153 males and 144 females, giving a sex ratio of 1.06 males per female, with 54 people (17.8%) aged under 15 years, 48 (15.8%) aged 15 to 29, 153 (50.5%) aged 30 to 64, and 42 (13.9%) aged 65 or older.

Ethnicities were 92.1% European/Pākehā, 10.9% Māori, 2.0% Pacific peoples, and 5.0% Asian. People may identify with more than one ethnicity.

Although some people chose not to answer the census's question about religious affiliation, 46.5% had no religion, 48.5% were Christian and 1.0% had other religions.

Of those at least 15 years old, 63 (25.3%) people had a bachelor's or higher degree, and 24 (9.6%) people had no formal qualifications. 69 people (27.7%) earned over $70,000 compared to 17.2% nationally. The employment status of those at least 15 was that 126 (50.6%) people were employed full-time, 39 (15.7%) were part-time, and 6 (2.4%) were unemployed.

Karapiro statistical area

The statistical area had a population of 2,334 at the 2018 New Zealand census, an increase of 384 people (19.7%) since the 2013 census, and an increase of 540 people (30.1%) since the 2006 census. There were 810 households, comprising 1,185 males and 1,149 females, giving a sex ratio of 1.03 males per female. The median age was 40.1 years (compared with 37.4 years nationally), with 522 people (22.4%) aged under 15 years, 375 (16.1%) aged 15 to 29, 1,167 (50.0%) aged 30 to 64, and 273 (11.7%) aged 65 or older.

Ethnicities were 95.1% European/Pākehā, 8.0% Māori, 1.5% Pacific peoples, 2.8% Asian, and 1.7% other ethnicities. People may identify with more than one ethnicity.

The percentage of people born overseas was 21.9, compared with 27.1% nationally.

Although some people chose not to answer the census's question about religious affiliation, 54.1% had no religion, 36.8% were Christian, 0.3% were Hindu, 0.1% were Muslim, 0.4% were Buddhist and 1.8% had other religions.

Of those at least 15 years old, 471 (26.0%) people had a bachelor's or higher degree, and 204 (11.3%) people had no formal qualifications. The median income was $44,200, compared with $31,800 nationally. 507 people (28.0%) earned over $70,000 compared to 17.2% nationally. The employment status of those at least 15 was that 1,077 (59.4%) people were employed full-time, 324 (17.9%) were part-time, and 30 (1.7%) were unemployed.

Lake Karapiro

Lake Karapiro is an artificial reservoir lake on the Waikato River, formed in 1947 by damming the Waikato River to store water for the 96-megawatt Karapiro hydroelectric power station.

The lake is regarded as one of New Zealand's best rowing venues. It hosted the World Rowing Championships in 1978 and 2010, as well as the rowing events for the 1950 British Empire Games. Lake Karapiro alternates with the South Island's Lake Ruataniwha in hosting the New Zealand national rowing championships and the New Zealand secondary school rowing championships (Maadi Cup).In March 2006, an International Rowing Federation inspection panel described Karapiro as one of the fairest and most picturesque courses in the world.

Karapiro Power Station

The 96-megawatt Karapiro Power Station is located adjacent to the dam at the head of the lake, and is the eighth and last hydroelectric power station located on the Waikato River. Each turbine turns a 32 MW generator, and the electricity from the generators is fed into Transpower's national transmission grid. The station is a base load generator due to its need to maintain water flows into the Waikato River system beyond the lake.

The ten-megawatt Horahora Power Station at Horahora, 13 km upstream of Karapiro Dam, part of an earlier hydroelectric power scheme, was flooded with the formation of Lake Karapiro.

Education

References

Waipa District
Populated places in Waikato
Populated places on the Waikato River